Kang Moon-kyu (born 24 April 1988, in Seoul) is a South Korean field hockey player. At the 2012 Summer Olympics, he competed for the national team in the men's tournament. His twin brother, Kang Moon-kweon, is also an Olympic field hockey player.

References

External links

Living people
1988 births
People from Gimhae
South Korean male field hockey players
Field hockey players at the 2012 Summer Olympics
Olympic field hockey players of South Korea
Asian Games medalists in field hockey
Field hockey players at the 2010 Asian Games
Field hockey players at the 2014 Asian Games
People from Seoul
South Korean twins
Asian Games bronze medalists for South Korea
Medalists at the 2014 Asian Games
South Korean Buddhists
Sportspeople from South Gyeongsang Province
2010 Men's Hockey World Cup players
2014 Men's Hockey World Cup players
20th-century South Korean people
21st-century South Korean people